Phalaenopsis pantherina, also known as the panther-like Phalaenopsis, is a species of orchid endemic to Borneo.). The species itself was once regarded as a variety of Phalaenopsis cornu-cervi and was described as Phalaenopsis cornu-cervi var. pantherina (Rchb.f.) O.Gruss & M.Wolff. However this is not accepted. It has also been erroneously been proposed, that Phalaenopsis luteola is a synonym of Phalaenopsis pantherina.

Conservation
It occurs in protected habitats, such as Crocker Range National Park. It has been rarely collected for botanical or horticultural purposes.

References

pantherina
Orchids of Borneo
Orchids of Malaysia
Orchids of Indonesia
Epiphytic orchids
Plants described in 1864